Redoutable-class submarine may refer to one of the following classes of submarine for the French Navy: